Bully's Restaurant is a restaurant in Jackson, Mississippi. In 2016 it was named one of America's Classics by the James Beard Foundation. The restaurant is located on Livingston Avenue in Jackson, Mississippi.

History 
Ballery Tyrone Bully built the restaurant with his father; both of them are masons. The restaurant opened in 1982. It originally opened as a snack shop serving sandwiches to local factory workers.

Menu 
The restaurant focusses on Southern cuisine and soul food staples such as chitterlings, neckbones, oxtails, macaroni and cheese, and greens. The Beard Foundation said "This is back-of-the-range cooking without peer. " The 2021 Moon U.S. Civil Rights Trail called the food "some soul food hall-of-fame-style cooking".

Recognition 
In 2016 the restaurant was named one of America's Classics by the James Beard Foundation.

References

Further reading 

 

Soul food restaurants in the United States
Restaurants in Mississippi
James Beard Foundation Award winners